Aoraki is a Māori word for Mount Cook, the highest mountain in New Zealand. The name may also refer to:

 3810 Aoraki, a main-belt asteroid discovered in 1985
 Aoraki / Mount Cook National Park, a National Park centred on Aoraki/Mount Cook
 Aoraki (New Zealand electorate), a former parliamentary electorate covering South Canterbury and northern Otago
 Aoraki (harvestman), a genus of Pettalidae (spiders)
 Aoraki Polytechnic, a tertiary institution in Timaru